Lady Eleanor Butler may refer to:
 Lady Eleanor (Charlotte) Butler (1739–1829), Irish noblewoman, one of the Ladies of Llangollen
 Eleanor Butler, Lady Wicklow, (1915–1997), Irish architect and politician
 Lady Eleanor Talbot (died 1468), whose married name was Butler, alleged wife of King Edward IV of England
 Eleanor Beaufort (1431–1501), daughter of Edmund Beaufort and Eleanor Beauchamp
 Eleanor Butler, Countess of Desmond, (c. 1545 – c.1636), Irish countess and politician

See also 
 Lady Butler (disambiguation)
 Eleanor Butler